Sergio Hernández may refer to the following people:

 Sergio Hernández (footballer)
 Sergio Hernández (racing driver) (born 1983), Spanish racing driver
 Sergio Hernández (basketball) (born 1963), Argentine basketball coach
 Sergio Sánchez Hernández (born 1968), Spanish athlete
 Sergio Hernández (actor) (born 1945), Chilean actor
 Sergio González Hernández (born 1955), Mexican politician
 Sergio Tolento Hernández (born 1959), Mexican politician
 Sergio Hernández Hernández (born 1962), Mexican politician
 Sergio Adrián Hernández Güereca (born 1994), Mexican teenager whose shooting led to a legal case considered twice by the Supreme Court of the United States as Hernandez v. Mesa